George Ormsby (November 24, 1916 – May 20, 2013) was an American plumber and political candidate from Pennsylvania. In 1988 and 1992, Ormsby was the vice-presidential nominee of the Prohibition Party.

Ormsby was born in Village Green-Green Ridge, Pennsylvania where he worked in a textile mill.

References

1916 births
2013 deaths
Pennsylvania Prohibitionists
Candidates in the 1988 United States presidential election
Candidates in the 1992 United States presidential election
Prohibition Party (United States) vice presidential nominees